Forgotten Fantasies is an album of duets by saxophonist David Liebman and pianist Richard Beirach which was recorded in New York in 1975 and released on the Horizon label.

Reception

The AllMusic review by David R. Adler stated, "Their stark and somewhat somber music, which would be perfectly at home on the ECM label, still sounds contemporary. Beirach's chords are lush and, at times, quite dissonant and opaque, providing a complex harmonic foundation for the lyrical post-Coltrane musings of Liebman".

Track listing 
All compositions by David Liebman except where noted
 "October 10th" (Richard Beirach) – 4:30
 "Repeat Performance" – 7:35 
 "Eugene" (Beirach) – 7:57
 "Forgotten Fantasies" – 5:24
 "Troubled Peace" – 4:50
 "Obsidian Mirrors" (Beirach) – 13:16

Personnel 
David Liebman – tenor saxophone, soprano saxophone, echoplex, phase shifter, alto flute 
Richard Beirach – acoustic piano

References 

 

Dave Liebman albums
Richie Beirach albums
1976 albums
Horizon Records albums
A&M Records albums